Greater Portsmouth Regional Airport  (Scioto County Airport) is on State Route 335 in Minford, Ohio, 12 miles northeast of Portsmouth, in Scioto County, Ohio. It is owned by the Scioto County Airport Authority. The National Plan of Integrated Airport Systems for 2011–2015 categorized it as a general aviation facility.

History 
The airport opened on June 27, 1957. The previous airport was Raven Rock Field, near the Ohio River at 38.715N 83.052W, a grass field with a 2200-foot run.

Lake Central Airlines served the airport from its opening until it merged into Allegheny Airlines in 1968; Allegheny pulled out in 1971. The airport has had no airline service since. Tyme Airlines of Columbus provided scheduled service in 1968. Cleveland based Wright Airlines served Portsmouth for a short time in the late 1960s.

Service on the three airlines in the 1960s are as follows. Lake Central used DC-3 & Nord 262 aircraft to Cincinnati. After merging with Allegheny, the aircraft was upgraded to Convair 580 prop jets that flew to both Cincinnati & Parkersburg, WV. Tyme Airlines flew small Piper Aztec equipment to both Columbus & Huntington WV. The fourth airline, Wright Airlines, used Beech 18 aircraft and also served the Columbus & Huntington WV airports.

Facilities
The airport covers 246 acres (100 ha) at an elevation of 663 feet (202 m). Its one runway, 18/36, is 5,001 by 100 feet (1,524 x 30 m) asphalt.

The airport offers fuel services along with a small snack bar, a restaurant, a couple of hangars, mechanics, and pilot snooze room.

In the year ending August 24, 2011 the airport had 45,830 aircraft operations, average 125 per day: 98% general aviation, 1% air taxi, and 1% military. 30 aircraft were then based at the airport: 77% single-engine, 13% multi-engine, 7% ultralight, and 3% jet.

References

External links 
 Greater Portsmouth Regional Airport at Scioto County website
 Aerial image as of March 1994 from USGS The National Map
 

Airports in Ohio
Airports established in 1957
Transportation in Scioto County, Ohio
Buildings and structures in Scioto County, Ohio
1957 establishments in Ohio